Glaresis is a genus of beetles, sometimes called "Enigmatic scarab beetles", in its own family, the Glaresidae. It is closely related to, and was formerly included in, the family Scarabaeidae. Although its members occur in arid and sandy areas worldwide (except Australia), only the nocturnal adults have ever been collected (typically at lights), and both the larvae and biology of Glaresis are as yet unknown. Due to their narrow habitat associations, a great number of these species occur in extremely limited geographic areas, and are accordingly imperiled by habitat destruction.

These beetles are small, 2.5–6 mm long, and have the stocky appearance typical of fossorial scarabs, with short, heavy, spurred legs. Color ranges from tan to dark brown, and the back is covered with short setae.

Efforts to raise glaresids in the laboratory were undertaken in the 1980s by C. H. Scholtz and others, but were unsuccessful.

Glaresis was originally classified with Trogidae (originally a subfamily within Scarabaeidae), and has many characteristics of "primitive" scarabaeoids, but no affinities to any of the other primitive groups; recent work suggests that they may in fact belong in Trogidae. Scholtz argued that Glaresis is the most primitive type of scarabaeoid, but more recent research indicates that the Pleocomidae hold this position. The species in North, Central,  and South America have been revised by Robert Gordon and Guy Hanley, January 2014, in the journal Insecta Mundi.

Species 

 Glaresis alfierii
 Glaresis arabica
 Glaresis arenata
 Glaresis australis
 Glaresis bajaensis
 Glaresis bautista
 Glaresis beckeri
 Glaresis caenulenta
 Glaresis california
 Glaresis canadensis
 Glaresis carthagensis
 Glaresis cartwrighti
 Glaresis ceballosi
 Glaresis celiae
 Glaresis clypeata
 Glaresis confusa
 Glaresis contrerasi
 Glaresis costaricensis
 Glaresis costata
 Glaresis dakotensis
 Glaresis dentata
 Glaresis desperata
 Glaresis donaldi
 Glaresis ecostata
 Glaresis exasperata
 Glaresis falli
 Glaresis foveolata
 Glaresis franzi
 Glaresis freyi
 Glaresis fritzi
 Glaresis frustrata
 Glaresis gineri
 Glaresis gordoni
 Glaresis handlirschi
 Glaresis hespericula
 Glaresis hispana
 Glaresis holmi
 Glaresis holzschuhi
 Glaresis howdeni
 Glaresis imitator
 Glaresis impressicollis
 Glaresis inducta
 Glaresis kocheri
 Glaresis koenigsbaueri
 Glaresis limbata
 Glaresis lomii
 Glaresis longisternum
 Glaresis mandibularis
 Glaresis maroccana
 Glaresis mauritanica
 Glaresis medialis
 Glaresis mendica
 Glaresis methneri
 Glaresis minuta
 Glaresis mondacai
 Glaresis montenegro
 Glaresis namibensis
 Glaresis obscura
 Glaresis ordosensis
 Glaresis orientalis
 Glaresis oxiana
 Glaresis paramendica
 Glaresis pardoalcaidei
 Glaresis pardoi
 Glaresis penrithae
 Glaresis phoenicis
 Glaresis porrecta
 Glaresis quedenfeldti
 Glaresis rufa
 Glaresis smithi
 Glaresis subulosa
 Glaresis texana
 Glaresis thiniensis
 Glaresis tripolitana
 Glaresis tumida
 Glaresis villiersi
 Glaresis walzlae
 Glaresis warneri
 Glaresis yanegai
 Glaresis zacateca
 Glaresis zarudniana
 Glaresis zvirgzdinsi

Fossil species 

 †Glaresis burmitica Cai and Huang 2018 Burmese amber, Myanmar, Cenomanian
 †Glaresis orthochilus Bai et al. 2010 Yixian Formation, China, Aptian
 †Glaresis tridentata Bai et al. 2014 Yixian Formation, China, Aptian

"Glaresis" cretacea Nikolajev 2007 from the Aptian aged Zaza Formation in Russia is considered questionable, with Cai and Huang 2018 considering it to have no diagnostic characters of the family.

References 

 Mary Liz Jameson, "Glaresidae", in Ross H. Arnett, Jr. and Michael C. Thomas, American Beetles (CRC Press, 2001), vol. 2

External links 
 Browne et al., Glaresis from the Tree of Life.

Scarabaeoidea genera
Scarabaeiformia